KRSV (1210 AM) is a radio station broadcasting a country music format, and is licensed to Afton, Wyoming, United States. The station is currently owned by Dan and Kim Dockstader, through licensee SVI Media, LLC, and features programming from Cumulus Media.

Previous logo
 (KRSV's logo under previous simulcast with KRSV-FM)

References

External links

RSV
Country radio stations in the United States
Lincoln County, Wyoming